Vuk Radivojević (born July 30, 1983) is a retired Serbian professional basketball player. He represented the Serbian national basketball team internationally.

Professional career
Radivojević had his first senior basketball experience with KK Sloga in 2002, after which he spent four years playing for Crvena zvezda, eventually becoming its captain. After two seasons spent in Spanish Fuenlabrada, then a member of the ACB League, he returned to Belgrade and played a season for Red Star and then another for FMP. In November 2013, he signed with Türk Telekom. On December 29, 2014, he signed with Śląsk Wrocław for the rest of the season.

On September 30, 2015, Radivojević signed a contract with the Bosnian team Igokea. He debuted for the team in 67–56 loss to Cedevita Zagreb in Round 1 of the ABA League; he scored 8 points on 3 from 14 shooting from the field.

In June 2019, Radivojević announced his retirement from playing career.

National team career
He was a member of the Serbian national basketball team at EuroBasket 2007.

See also 
 List of Serbia men's national basketball team players
 KK Crvena zvezda accomplishments and records

References

External links

 Vuk Radivojević at aba-liga.com
 Vuk Radivojević at draftexpress.com
 Vuk Radivojević at eurobasket.com
 Vuk Radivojević at euroleague.net

1983 births
Living people
ABA League players
Baloncesto Fuenlabrada players
Basketball League of Serbia players
Guards (basketball)
KK Crvena zvezda players
KK FMP (1991–2011) players
KK Igokea players
KK Sloga players
Liga ACB players
Serbian basketball executives and administrators
Serbia men's national basketball team players
Serbian expatriate basketball people in Bosnia and Herzegovina
Serbian expatriate basketball people in Poland
Serbian expatriate basketball people in Spain
Serbian expatriate basketball people in Turkey
Serbian men's basketball players
Śląsk Wrocław basketball players
Türk Telekom B.K. players